The Brown Bears are the sports teams that represent Brown University, an American university located in Providence, Rhode Island. The Bears are part of the Ivy League conference. Brown's mascot is Bruno. Both the men's and women's teams share the name, competing in 28 National Collegiate Athletic Association (NCAA) Division I sports. In football, the Bears, along with all other the Ivy League teams, compete in the Football Championship Subdivision (FCS).

Varsity athletics
The Bears participate in 28 NCAA sports. The Bears first fielded a football team in 1878, playing Amherst College in their inaugural game.

The Bears participate in the following varsity sports:

Additions and subtractions
In 2011, a Special Committee recommended that Brown cut four varsity sports due to Brown's budget cut backs—men's fencing, women's fencing, men's wrestling, and women's skiing—and recommended elevating at least one women's sport to varsity status to ensure Title IX compliance. These proposed changes would have reduced the number of varsity sports at Brown from 37 to 34. None of the four varsity programs were cut.

In May 2020, Brown announced they would transition eleven varsity programs—men's and women's fencing, men's and women's golf, women's skiing, men's and women's squash, women's equestrian, men's indoor track and field, men's outdoor track and field and men's cross country—to club status. Women's sailing and coed sailing would become varsity programs. Brown had 38 varsity sports before the announced cuts (only Harvard and Stanford had more), but was the least successful Ivy League school, winning 2.8% of league titles from 2008 to 2018.

In December 2020, the women's fencing and equestrian teams were restored to varsity status.

Teams

Football

The Brown Bears football  team  competes in the NCAA Division I Football Championship Subdivision (FCS) and are members of the Ivy League. Brown's first football team was fielded in 1878. The team plays its home games at the 20,000 seat Brown Stadium in Providence.

Men's basketball

The Brown Bears men's basketball team competes in the Ivy League. The Brown Bears have appeared in the NCAA Tournament two times, including the inaugural tournament in 1939. Their combined record is 0–2. The Brown Bears have appeared in the National Invitation Tournament (NIT) one time. Their record is 0–1.

Women's basketball

The Brown Bears women's basketball team competes in the Ivy League. The Brown Bears have appeared in the NCAA Tournament once in 1994, where their record was 0–1.

Men's lacrosse

The Brown Bears men's lacrosse team competes in the Ivy League and plays its home games at Stevenson-Pincince Field.

Men's soccer

The Brown Bears men's soccer team compete in the NCAA Division I in the Ivy League. The Bears have been semifinalists in the NCAA tournament in 1968, 1973, and 1975. They also finished in fourth place in 1977.

Rugby
Women's rugby at Brown was originally founded as a club team, Brown Women's RFC, in 1977. Brown added rugby as a varsity sport for women beginning in the 2014-15 academic year, due in part to the growth of rugby across communities and at the high school level. Brown women's rugby is led by Head Coach Kathy Flores.

Brown has offered men's rugby at Brown as a club sport since 1960. Brown plays in the Ivy Rugby Conference against its traditional Ivy League rivals. Brown men's rugby is led by Head Coach David Laflamme. Despite its club status, Brown men's rugby is supported by an endowment raised by Brown rugby alumni that exceeds $1.5 million; this endowment funds the full-time professional head coaching position and other expenses.

Championships

NCAA team championships

Brown has 7 NCAA team national championships.

Women's (7)
Rowing  (7): 1999, 2000, 2002, 2004, 2007, 2008, 2011
see also:
Ivy League NCAA team championships
List of NCAA schools with the most NCAA Division I championships

Non-NCAA team championships
Coed Sailing (2)
Coed Dinghy National Champions (2): 1942, 1948
Women's Sailing (5)
Women's Dinghy National Champions (5): 1985, 1988, 1989, 1998, 2019
Men's Ultimate Frisbee (3)
 USA Ultimate College Champions (3): 2000, 2005, 2019

Mascot

Brown's first mascot was a burro, first introduced in 1902 in a game against Harvard. The burro mascot was not retained after it seemed frightened by the noise of the game, and due to the laughter it provoked. The University originally settled on the Bruin, but later changed it to a bear after the head of a bear was placed at an archway above the student union in 1904. In 1905 The Bears introduced Helen, the university's first live bear mascot, at a game against Dartmouth. Bruno, Brown's current mascot, was introduced in 1921, originally also as a live bear. A number of bears represented Bruno over the years, later being represented by a person in costume by the late 60's.

Notable athletes
The Bears have produced many notable athletes. One of Brown's most famous athletes is John Heisman, namesake of the Heisman Trophy. Before finishing college at the University of Pennsylvania, Heisman played college football at Brown as a lineman.

Football
Thomas A. Barry (Class of 1902): All American running back, head coach of The University of Notre Dame and University of Tulane  football programs
Don Colo (Class of 1950): professional American football player, All-Pro who played for the Cleveland Browns
Zak DeOssie (Class of 2007): professional American football player, Pro Bowl longsnapper for the Super Bowl XLII and XLVI champion New York Giants
John Heisman: college American football player and coach; namesake of the Heisman Trophy
Steve Jordan (Class of 1981): professional American football player, 6-time All-Pro tight end who played for the Minnesota Vikings
Ed Lawrence (Class of 1928): American football player, member of the 1926 "Iron Men" football team
Sean Morey: Special Teams Captain of 2005 Super Bowl XL Champion Pittsburgh Steelers
Joe Paterno (Class of 1950):  quarterback and cornerback for the Bears, head coach of the Penn State Nittany Lions from 1966 to 2011.
Fritz Pollard: First African-American NFL coach and one of the first two African American players.
Earl Sprackling, Brown quarterback, 1909–11; named the deserving retrospective recipient of the Heisman Trophy for 1910 by "ESPN College Football Encyclopedia: The Complete History of the Game".
Thurston Towle (Class of 1928): American football player, member of the 1926 "Iron Men" football team
Wallace Wade (Class of 1917): American football coach at the University of Alabama and Duke University, namesake of Duke's football stadium

Baseball
Bill Almon: professional baseball player, #1 pick in the 1974 Major League Baseball draft
Mark Attanasio (Class of 1979): financier and owner of the Milwaukee Brewers
Tommy Dowd: professional baseball player
Dave Fultz (Class of 1898): professional baseball player
Irving "Bump" Hadley (Class of 1928): professional baseball player, pitcher for the Washington Senators and New York Yankees
Lee Richmond: professional baseball player, first major league player to throw a perfect game

Rowing
Jamie Koven (Class of 1995): US national rower, World Champion in single scull 1997 France
Xeno Muller (Class of 1993): Swiss rower, Olympic gold medalist in single scull 1996 Atlanta 
Denis Žvegelj (Class of 1997): Slovenian Rower, Brown Crew Varsity Eight 1994, 1995, 1992 bronze medalist in Men's Coxless Pairs
Tessa Gobbo (Class of 2013): US national rower, Olympic Gold Medalist in women's eight, 2016

Ice hockey
Katie King-Crowley (Class of 1997): Olympic gold ('98), silver ('02), and bronze ('06) medal-winning hockey player
Curt Bennett (Class of 1970): professional ice hockey player, St. Louis Blues and Atlanta Flames
Yann Danis (Class of 2004): professional ice hockey player, Montreal Canadiens and New York Islanders
Brian Eklund: retired professional hockey player, Stanley Cup Champion

Other sports
Craig Kinsley (Class of 2011): professional javelin thrower, 2010 NCAA Champion and member of the 2012 U.S. Olympic Team. Current Assistant Throws' Coach for Brown Track & Field
Daveed Diggs (Class of 2004): track and field, set the Brown Bears' record for the 110 hurdles as a sophomore with a time of 14.21 seconds. Went on to a successful career in acting.
Mark Donohue (Class of 1959): professional racing driver, 1972 Indianapolis 500 champion
Cory Gibbs (Class of 2001): professional soccer player, Chicago Fire
Lindsay Gottlieb (Class of 1999): head coach of University of California women's basketball
Anne Hird (born 1959) — pioneering female distance runner, US National Champion in the 10-mile and 30K races
Fred Hovey (1890): professional tennis player, US Open Men's Doubles Champion (1893) and Men's Singles Champion (1895)
 Jimmy Pedro: most decorated American judo athlete; Judo World Champion (1999), two-time Olympic bronze medalist (1996, 2004)
 Alicia Sacramone (2007): gymnast who competed at the 2008 Summer Olympics
Norman Taber (Class of 1913): track and field athlete, member of the 1912 Olympic gold medal-winning 3,000-m relay team
Fred Tenney: professional baseball player
Chazz Woodson (Class of 2005): Major League Lacrosse player currently with the Chicago Machine

References

External links